Limitrophe Island is an oval-shaped Antarctic island  long, lying directly east of Christine Island and  south of Anvers Island. Limitrophe Island was given a suggestive name by Palmer Station personnel in 1972, because Limitrophe Island lies at the limit of normal field operations from the station.

See also
 Composite Antarctic Gazetteer
 List of Antarctic and sub-Antarctic islands
 List of Antarctic islands south of 60° S
 SCAR
 Territorial claims in Antarctica

References

External links

Islands of the Palmer Archipelago